The 2005 SWAC men's basketball tournament was held March 10–13, 2005, at Bill Harris Arena in Birmingham, Alabama.  defeated , 72–53 in the championship game. The Jaguars received the conference's automatic bid to the 2005 NCAA tournament as one of two No. 16 seeds in the East Region.

Bracket and results

References

2004–05 Southwestern Athletic Conference men's basketball season
SWAC men's basketball tournament